Karakh may refer to:

 Karakh, Pakistan, a town in Pakistan
 Çaraq, a village in Azerbaijan

See also 
 Karkh
 Kharak